Gombojavyn Ochirbat (born 15 November 1929) is a Mongolian Communist political figure. He was a General Secretary of the Central Committee of the Mongolian People's Revolutionary Party from March 14, 1990, until April 13, 1990. During his tenure, the party's leading role was abolished (on March 23).

References

1929 births
Living people
Mongolian People's Party politicians